"Entre le bœuf et l'âne gris" (Between the ox and the grey donkey), also known as "Le sommeil de l'enfant Jésus" (The sleep of baby Jesus) is a French Christmas carol. One of the oldest extant carols, it has been dated to both the 13th and the 16th centuries.

The supposed presence of the two animals at the birth of Jesus may have its origin in the Book of Isaiah chapter 1 verse 3: "The ox knoweth his owner, and the ass his master's crib: but Israel doth not know, my people doth not consider."

Tune

Lyrics
Entre le bœuf et l’âne gris
Dort, dort, dort le petit fils
Mille anges divins, mille séraphins
Volent à l’entour de ce grand dieu d’amour.

Entre les deux bras de Marie
Dort, dort, dort le fruit de vie
Mille anges divins, mille séraphins
Volent à l’entour de ce grand dieu d’amour.

Entre les roses et les lys
Dort, dort, dort le petit fils
Mille anges divins, mille séraphins
Volent à l’entour de ce grand dieu d’amour.

Entre les pastoureaux jolis
Dort, dort, Jésus qui sourit
Mille anges divins, mille séraphins
Volent à l’entour de ce grand dieu d’amour.

En ce beau jour si solennel
Dort, dort, dort l’Emmanuel
Mille anges divins, mille séraphins
Volent à l’entour de ce grand dieu d’amour.
Between the ox and the grey donkey
Sleeps, sleeps, sleeps the little son,
A thousand divine angels, a thousand seraphim
Fly around this great God of love.

Between the two arms of Mary
Sleeps, sleeps, sleeps the fruit of life,
A thousand divine angels, a thousand seraphim
Fly around this great God of love.

Between the roses and the lilies,
Sleeps, sleeps, sleeps the little son,
A thousand divine angels, a thousand seraphim
Fly around this great God of love.

Amidst the gentle shepherds
Sleeps, sleeps Jesus who smiles,
A thousand divine angels, a thousand seraphim
Fly around this great God of love.

On this beautiful, so solemn day
Sleeps, sleeps, sleeps Emmanuel,
A thousand divine angels, a thousand seraphim
Fly around this great God of love.

See also
 List of Christmas carols

References

External links
 

Christmas carols
French folk songs
Songwriter unknown
French-language Christmas carols